The Claire Swire email of 2000 was a very personal email from Claire Swire to Bradley Chait, who worked at Norton Rose, a law firm in London, England. She described his semen as "yum." He forwarded it to six friends, one of whom in turn forwarded it further with the subject line of "Do you know Claire Swire" until it spread worldwide within days, and received wide coverage in newspapers and television. The author of the original email is in doubt, as Chait later alleged that the email was a hoax perpetrated by colleagues.

Because of its wide coverage, the incident is often cited as an example of the problems that staff can cause to the reputation of their employer (and the risk of embarrassment and disciplinary measures) by forwarding personal or questionable material.

References

Further reading 
  
  — Report on the fate of forwarders

External links
Advice to management Tech Republic
ePolicy Institute 
Trevor Luxton e-mail: Unclever Trevor Snopes.com, 12 July 2007 - examples of similar incidents

2000 in London
Email
Internet memes